The Star Boarder is a 1914 American short comedy film starring Charlie Chaplin.

The film is also known as The Landlady's Pet, its 1918 American reissue title.

Synopsis
Charlie, a resident in a boarding house, is the favorite of his landlord's wife. His fellow male boarders are jealous of the situation and dislike Charlie because of it. They arrange to frighten him with a dummy. Charlie is frightened and runs to the police. Meanwhile, a tramp has hidden himself in a cupboard. The police find him, making Charlie a hero for the moment. The mischievous young son of the landlord, however, has taken a series of compromising photographs and displays them to everyone in a magic lantern show. Two scandals are revealed: One photo shows Charlie kissing the proprietor's wife. Another shows the proprietor flirting with another woman.

The young son was played by Gordon Griffith. Four years later Griffith would play the young title character in the first movie adaptation of Tarzan of the Apes.

Review
Motion Picture News said of The Star Boarder, "[It is] a very funny comedy. The landlady is too familiar with the star boarder to suit her husband. He gets even, however, by going out with another woman."

Cast
 Charles Chaplin as The Star Boarder
 Minta Durfee as Landlady
 Edgar Kennedy as Landlady's husband
 Gordon Griffith as Their son
 Alice Davenport as Landlady's friend
 Phyllis Allen (uncredited boarder)
 Jess Dandy (uncredited boarder)
 Billy Gilbert (uncredited boarder)
 Wallace MacDonald (uncredited boarder)
 Harry McCoy (uncredited boarder)
 Rube Miller (uncredited boarder)
 Lee Morris (uncredited boarder)
 William Nigh (uncredited boarder)
 Al St. John (uncredited boarder)

Reception
Like many American films of the time, The Star Boarder was subject to restrictions and cuts by city and state film censorship boards. For example, the Chicago Board of Censors required, when the film was submitted for review for its 1918 reissue as The Landlady's Pet, cuts of Chaplin thumbing his nose and the scene of Chaplin inflating his trousers and looking into them.

See also
 List of American films of 1914
 Charlie Chaplin filmography

References

External links

 

1914 films
1914 comedy films
American silent short films
American black-and-white films
Films directed by George Nichols
Films produced by Mack Sennett
1914 short films
Silent American comedy films
Articles containing video clips
American comedy short films
1910s American films